Worcester County Courthouse is a historic Greek Revival and Classical Revival building at 2 Main Street in Worcester, Massachusetts in the Lincoln Square district and within the historic Institutional District. It was individually listed on the National Register of Historic Places in 2021.

History
The oldest portion of the current building was constructed in 1845 by Ammi B. Young on a parcel of land which had been the site of a courthouse since the 1730s. Stephen C. Earle constructed an 1878 addition onto the building and an 1899 addition was completed by Andrews, Jaques & Rantoul. The last major addition was in the 1950s. 

From 2019 to 2021, the building was extensively renovated and converted into 118 private residential housing units known as the Courthouse Lofts, and the building houses a historical display about Major Marshall Taylor, a prominent local African American bicyclist. The courthouse site also contains a statue of General
Charles Devens by Daniel Chester French and Edward Clark Potter, and the courthouse site was added to the National Register of Historic Places in 2021.

Notes

References

External links

Official Courthouse Lofts site

		
National Register of Historic Places in Worcester County, Massachusetts
Buildings and structures completed in 1845